Joseph Anthony Lefante (September 8, 1928 – February 26, 1997) was an American businessman and Democratic Party politician who represented New Jersey's 14th congressional district for one term from 1977 to 1978.

Early life and education
Born in Bayonne, Lefante graduated from Bayonne High School.
He completed courses at the Real Estate Institute of New Jersey in 1957.
He served in the New Jersey National Guard from 1947 to 1952.

Political career
He was a business owner and served as a member of the Bayonne city council from 1962 to 1970. He was also a member of the Bayonne Board of Education from 1964 to 1967.

He was elected to the New Jersey General Assembly and served from 1969 to 1976.

Disputed quote
On January 13, 1976, he addressed the general assembly, during which he stated: "Courage is what it takes to stand up and speak; courage is also what it takes to sit down and listen." This quote has been misattributed in internet memes to Winston Churchill. Although the original source of this aphorism is unknown, LeFante is the first known source and there is no evidence that Winston Churchill is the source for this saying.

He served as a delegate to the New Jersey state Democratic convention, 1975. He served as a delegate to the Democratic National Convention, 1975.

Congress
Lefante was elected as a Democrat to the Ninety-fifth Congress, serving until his resignation on December 14, 1978.

After Congress
He was appointed Commissioner of Community Affairs by Governor Brendan Byrne, serving from 1978 to 1982.

He was an unsuccessful candidate for nomination to the United States Senate in 1982.

Death
He died on February 26, 1997, in Manhattan, New York City.
He was interred in Rose Hill Cemetery, Linden, New Jersey.

References

|-

|-

|-

|-

1928 births
1997 deaths
Politicians from Bayonne, New Jersey
American people of Italian descent
Bayonne High School alumni
Commissioners of the New Jersey Department of Community Affairs
New Jersey city council members
Democratic Party members of the United States House of Representatives from New Jersey
Democratic Party members of the New Jersey General Assembly
Speakers of the New Jersey General Assembly
20th-century American politicians